The 1985 Israel Super Cup was the 15th Israel Super Cup (20th, including unofficial matches, as the competition wasn't played within the Israel Football Association in its first 5 editions, until 1969), an annual Israel football match played between the winners of the previous season's Top Division and Israel State Cup.

The match was played between Maccabi Haifa, champions of the 1984–85 Liga Leumit and Beitar Jerusalem, winners of the 1984–85 Israel State Cup.

This was Maccabi Haifa's 3rd Israel Super Cup appearance (including unofficial matches) and Beitar's 4th. At the match, played at Kiryat Haim Stadium, Maccabi Haifa won 5–2.

Match details

References

1985
Super Cup
Super Cup 1985
Super Cup 1985
Israel Super Cup matches